Estadio dos Arcos is a multi-use stadium in Vila do Conde, Portugal. It is used mostly for football matches of Primeira Liga club Rio Ave. The stadium is able to hold 12,815 people and was built in 1985.

Since November 2020 it's only able to hold around 5300 people as the eastern stand was demolished for structural problems.

References

Rio Ave F.C.
Rio Ave FC
Vila do Conde
Sports venues in Porto District
Sports venues completed in 1985
1985 establishments in Portugal